The Samuel J. Wright House, also known as the Greek Revival Cottage, is an historic house at 59 Rice Street in Cambridge, Massachusetts.  This modest 1.5-story Greek Revival cottage is one of the finest of its type in northwestern Cambridge.  It was built in 1847 by housewright Samuel J. Wright.  It features a fully pedimented gable end, original pedimented gable dormers on the left side, and fluted columns supporting an entablature.  The side-hall front door is flanked by full-length sidelight windows and pilasters.

The house was listed on the National Register of Historic Places in 1982.

See also
National Register of Historic Places listings in Cambridge, Massachusetts

References

Houses on the National Register of Historic Places in Cambridge, Massachusetts
Houses completed in 1847
Wooden houses in the United States
1847 establishments in Massachusetts
Greek Revival architecture in Massachusetts